The men's singles of the 2016 Advantage Cars Prague Open tournament was played on clay in Prague, Czech Republic.
 
Rogério Dutra Silva was the defending champion but chose not to defend his title.

Santiago Giraldo won the title after defeating Uladzimir Ignatik 6–4, 3–6, 7–6(7–2) in the final.

Seeds

Draw

Finals

Top half

Bottom half

References

External Links
 Main Draw
 Qualifying Draw

2016 Men's Singles
Advantage Cars Prague Open - Singles